Saint-Clair-du-Rhône (literally Saint-Clair of the Rhône) is a commune in the Isère department in southeastern France.

Population

Twin towns
Saint-Clair-du-Rhône is twinned with:

  Mammola, Italy, since 2010

See also
Communes of the Isère department

References

Communes of Isère
Isère communes articles needing translation from French Wikipedia